Susanna Thompson (born January 27, 1958) is an American actress. She is known for her roles in films Little Giants (1994), Ghosts of Mississippi (1996), Random Hearts (1999) and Dragonfly (2002). On television, Thompson played Dr. Lenara Kahn in the episode "Rejoined" in Star Trek: Deep Space Nine (1995), the Borg Queen in three episodes of Star Trek: Voyager (1999–2000), Karen Sammler on the drama series Once and Again (1999–2002), and Moira Queen on the series Arrow (2012–2020).

Career 
Thompson has appeared on stage, winning  a Dramatic Award for her role as Luisa in A Shayna Maidel. She was also nominated for Best Actress by the San Diego Critics Circle for her role in Agnes of God.

Thompson may be best known for her television work, which includes playing Karen Sammler on Once and Again, Michelle Generoo in an episode of The X-Files and a recurring role as the Borg Queen in the Star Trek: Voyager two-part episodes "Dark Frontier" (1999) and "Unimatrix Zero" (2000). Thompson also portrayed Denise Hydecker in the 1998 television film The Lake.

One of Thompson's most controversial television appearances was on an episode of Star Trek: Deep Space Nine titled "Rejoined". In the episode, she participated in one of US television's earlier same-sex kisses.  The episode first aired on October 30, 1995.

She made a guest appearance on Law and Order: SVU on October 7, 2003 in the season five episode "Mother", playing Dr. Greta Heints, a psychiatrist who rehabilitates sex offenders in order to prepare them for a return to society.

Beginning in January 2006, she had a starring role in the short-lived NBC drama The Book of Daniel. In November 2006, she made her first appearance as Army Lieutenant Colonel Hollis Mann on the CBS series NCIS, in the recurring role of Agent Gibbs' love interest.  That same week, she appeared on Without a Trace.

In 2009, Thompson starred on the short-lived NBC series Kings, based on the biblical story of David, as Queen Rose Benjamin, an analogue of Ahinoam, the wife of Saul.

In 2012, Thompson started a two season run as Moira Queen in the main cast of the CW series Arrow, returning as a guest in later seasons. Thompson appeared in the recurring role of Carolyn Preston in the NBC series Timeless (2016–2018).

Personal life 
Thompson earned her bachelor's degree in drama from San Diego State University. Her husband, Martin Katz, is a professor there.

Filmography

Film

Television

References

External links 

1958 births
Actresses from San Diego
American film actresses
American stage actresses
American television actresses
Living people
San Diego State University alumni
21st-century American women